Ruth Buskirk is a professor at the University of Texas at Austin. She has served on the university's faculty for over twenty five years and is a Distinguished Senior Lecturer in Biology. She holds the Worthington Endowed Professorship for Ecology and Evolutionary Biology in Plan II.

Awards
 Postdoctoral Fellow, American Association of University Women
 American Men and Women of Science, 1975–present
 National Academies of Education Fellow in the Life Sciences, 2008-2009

References

Living people
University of Texas at Austin faculty
Year of birth missing (living people)